Donatien Gomis (born 7 November 1994) is a Senegalese professional footballer who plays as a centre-back for Guingamp.

Career
Gomis moved from Senegal to France at the age of 6 and began playing football at Niort, and thereafter played at the youth academies of Saint-Liguaire, Chauray and FC Saint-Cyr. He began his senior career with Chauray in 2015. He moved to Angoulême in 2017 where he played for 3 seasons. In 2021, he moved to Les Herbiers and the next year he moved to Concarneau in the 2021-22 season in the Championnat National on 15 June 2021. After a successful season as a starter, he moved to the Ligue 2 club Guingamp on 21 June 2022.

References

External links
 
 

1994 births
Living people
Footballers from Dakar
Senegalese footballers
Association football defenders
Angoulême Charente FC players
Les Herbiers VF players
US Concarneau players
En Avant Guingamp players
Ligue 2 players
Championnat National players
Championnat National 2 players
Championnat National 3 players
Senegalese expatriate footballers
Senegalese expatriate sportspeople in France
Expatriate footballers in France